Bongbong Roxy Vestidas Dorlas (born 2 September 1987) is a Filipino football coach and former player. He is currently the chairman of Loyola, and was the first head coach of Philippines Football League (PFL) club Maharlika Manila.

Personal life
Dorlas grew up in The Hague, Netherlands. Every two years he and his parents would go to the Philippines, the home country of his mother, for a vacation. At age 17, Dorlas and his family moved to the Philippines.

Playing career

Collegiate
Dorlas was invited by the high school coach of the girls' football varsity team of San Beda College to join the school's men's varsity team after he was seen kicking a ball. Dorlas' sister was a player of the school's football team. Dorlas joined a training session with the men's varsity team and decided to study at San Beda and suit for the school's team.

He led San Beda in winning the football title at NCAA Season 86 in 2011.

Club
Dorlas played for Mendiola FC 1991. He joined the Loyola Meralco Sparks in 2011 and with the club won the 2013 UFL Cup and 2014–15 PFF National Men's Club Championship. He left Loyola in 2015 to join Global F.C.

International
Dorlas was part of the Philippines national football team from 2008 to 2010.

He was part of the Philippines squad that participated at the 2010 AFF Futsal Championship.

Coaching career

Loyola
In 2015, Dorlas was coaching the under-15 team of Loyola. In January 2017, after a brief playing stint with Global FC, Dorlas returns to Loyola as part of head coach Aris Caslib's staff which marked the end of his playing career.

Philippines U16
He became head coach of the Philippine boy's under-16 team and will mentor the team in the 2018 AFC U-16 Championship qualification in September 2017.

Philippines U19
In 2018, Dorlas was appointed as assistant coach of the Philippines U19.

Philippines U16
In 2019, Dorlas once again coached the Philippines under-16 team in the 2019 AFF U-16 Youth Championship.

Maharlika
On 24 August 2020 he was appointed as the first ever head coach of newly organized Maharlika Football Club.

References

External links

1987 births
Living people
Dutch people of Filipino descent
Citizens of the Philippines through descent
Filipino people of Dutch descent
Footballers from The Hague
Association football fullbacks
Dutch footballers
Filipino footballers
Philippines international footballers
Filipino men's futsal players
Filipino football head coaches
F.C. Meralco Manila players
Global Makati F.C. players
San Beda University alumni